Edwin Thomas "Ed" Shaughnessy (January 29, 1929 – May 24, 2013) was a swing music and jazz drummer long associated with Doc Severinsen and a member of The Tonight Show Band on The Tonight Show Starring Johnny Carson.

Biography
Shaughnessy was born in Jersey City, New Jersey and grew up in the New York City area, working in the 1940s with George Shearing, Jack Teagarden, and Charlie Ventura.  In the 1950s he worked in the Charlie Ventura, Benny Goodman and Tommy Dorsey bands.  In the 1960s he played for Count Basie prior to joining The Tonight Show Band. He was the drummer on Bashin': The Unpredictable Jimmy Smith in 1962 which featured big band arrangements by Oliver Nelson, including the pop hit "Walk on the Wild Side" which peaked at #21 on the Billboard chart. Shaughnessy recorded extensively throughout his career and was known for his drum competitions with Buddy Rich.

Although best known as a big band drummer, Shaughnessy also performed small group work with Gene Ammons, Roy Eldridge, Billie Holiday, Mundell Lowe, Teo Macero, Charles Mingus, Shirley Scott, Jack Sheldon, Horace Silver, and many others. For several years Shaughnessy was a member of the house band at Birdland and other New York clubs. In the early 1970s he was doing similar work in Los Angeles and is credited with discovering Diane Schuur, whom he introduced at the 1976 Monterey Jazz Festival. Shaughnessy played in an early incarnation of the "Sesame Street" orchestra along with percussionist Danny Epstein, reed player Wally Kane, and, on occasion, guitarist Bucky Pizzarelli.

He was an endorser of Ludwig drums, Sabian cymbals and Pro-Mark drumsticks.

Shaughnessy was married to Ilene Woods, the original voice of Cinderella, who died in 2010. He died of a heart attack in Calabasas, California at the age of 84.  He was cremated. He was survived by his son Daniel, his stepdaughter Stephanie and grandchildren.  His other son James preceded him in death from a car accident in 1984.

Discography

As sideman
With Trigger Alpert
 Trigger Happy! (Riverside, 1956)
With Gene Ammons
 The Soulful Moods of Gene Ammons (Moodsville, 1962)
With George Barnes
Guitars Galore (Mercury Records, 1961)
With Count Basie
 Basie Swingin' Voices Singin' (ABC-Paramount, 1966) with the Alan Copeland Singers
 Broadway Basie's...Way (Command, 1966)
 Hollywood...Basie's Way (Command, 1967)
 Basie's Beat (Verve, 1967)
 Half a Sixpence (Dot, 1967)
With George Benson
 The Other Side of Abbey Road (A&M, 1970)
With Stephen Bishop
 Bish (ABC, 1978)
With Bob Brookmeyer
 The Dual Role of Bob Brookmeyer (Prestige, 1954)
With Gary Burton
 The Groovy Sound of Music (RCA, 1963)
With Teddy Charles
 New Directions (Prestige, 1953)
 Collaboration West (Prestige, 1953)
 Word from Bird (Atlantic, 1957)
 Jazz In The Garden At The Museum Of Modern Art (Warwick Records, 1960)
With Jimmy Forrest
 Soul Street (New Jazz, 1962)
With Dizzy Gillespie
 Cornucopia (Solid State, 1969)
With Jimmy Giuffre
 The Music Man (Atlantic, 1958)
With Honi Gordon
 Honi Gordon Sings (Prestige, 1962)
With Johnny Hodges
 Mess of Blues (Verve, 1964) with Wild Bill Davis 
With Etta Jones
 From the Heart (Prestige, 1962)
 Lonely and Blue (Prestige, 1962)
With Quincy Jones
 Golden Boy (Mercury, 1964)
With Hubert Laws
 Crying Song (CTI, 1969)
With Peggy Lee
 Black Coffee (Decca, 1953)
With Mundell Lowe
 The Mundell Lowe Quartet (Riverside, 1955)
 Guitar Moods (Riverside, 1956)
 New Music of Alec Wilder (Riverside, 1956)
 Porgy & Bess (RCA Camden, 1958)
 TV Action Jazz! (RCA Camden, 1959)
 Themes from Mr. Lucky, the Untouchables and Other TV Action Jazz (RCA Camden, 1960)
 Satan in High Heels (soundtrack) (Charlie Parker, 1961)
With Maria Muldaur
 Maria Muldaur (Reprise, 1973)
With Oliver Nelson
 Impressions of Phaedra (United Artists, 1962)
 Happenings with Hank Jones (Impulse!, 1966)
With Joe Newman 
 Joe Newman with Woodwinds (Roulette, 1958)
 Joe Newman Quintet at Count Basie's (Mercury, 1961)
With Lalo Schifrin
 Between Broadway & Hollywood (MGM, 1963)
With Shirley Scott
 For Members Only (Impulse!, 1963)
 Roll 'Em: Shirley Scott Plays the Big Bands (Impulse!, 1966)
With Ed Summerlin
 Ring Out Joy (Avant-Garde, 1968)
With Clark Terry
 Color Changes (Candid, 1960)
 Clark Terry Plays the Jazz Version of All American (Moodsville, 1962)
With Cal Tjader
Several Shades of Jade (Verve, 1963)
Warm Wave (Verve, 1964)
With Chuck Wayne
The Jazz Guitarist (Savoy, 1953 [1956])

References

External links

Pictures and biography

Ed Shaughnessy Interview NAMM Oral History Library (2004)

1929 births
2013 deaths
Swing drummers
Bebop drummers
American jazz drummers
Musicians from Jersey City, New Jersey
The Tonight Show Band members